Sayajigunj is an area in the western side of Vadodara City in the state of Gujarat in India.

Vadodara Railway Station and Central State Transport Bus depot is located in Sayajigung, which is why it is referred as a gate way to Vadodaracity. Maharaja Sayajirao University of Baroda, Vadodara Stock Exchange and Sayaji Baug are also located in this area. This area has attraction of youngster, due to the fact area being close to University, Some Major Hotels are located in this area, to name some Sayaji, Surya Palace, Kalyan (one of the oldest fast food restaurant in area), Dairy Den (Ice cream parlour), recently Amul has opened one retail counter in this area. Subway has also established its presence in Sayajigunj. Mostly, area is covered with stock brokers offices, hotels for stay, restaurants, banks, commercial Complex and University.  

Urban and suburban areas of Vadodara